Newell is a city in Butte County, South Dakota, United States. The population was 584 at the 2020 census.

Newell was laid out in 1910. The city has the name of F. H. Newell, director of the United States Reclamation Service.

Geography
Newell is located at  (44.716261, -103.423094).

Newell has been assigned the ZIP code 57760 and the FIPS place code 44860.

Climate

Demographics

2010 census
As of the census of 2010, there were 603 people, 270 households, and 172 families living in the city. The racial makeup of the city was 92.7% White, 0.2% African American, 1.7% Native American, 0.3% Asian, 0.5% Pacific Islander, and 4.6% from two or more races. Hispanic or Latino of any race were 1.0% of the population.

There were 270 households, of which 24.1% had children under the age of 18 living with them, 47.8% were married couples living together, 11.1% had a female householder with no husband present, 4.8% had a male householder with no wife present, and 36.3% were non-families. 33.0% of all households were made up of individuals, and 15.6% had someone living alone who was 65 years of age or older. The average household size was 2.23 and the average family size was 2.78.

The median age in the city was 48.2 years. 23.9% of residents were under the age of 18; 4% were between the ages of 18 and 24; 19.3% were from 25 to 44; 30.5% were from 45 to 64; and 22.2% were 65 years of age or older. The gender makeup of the city was 51.1% male and 48.9% female.

2000 census
As of the census of 2000, there were 646 people, 274 households, and 178 families living in the city. The population density was 646.9 people per square mile (249.4/km2). There were 337 housing units at an average density of 337.5 per square mile (130.1/km2). The racial makeup of the city was 97.37% White, 1.55% Native American, 0.15% Asian, and 0.93% from two or more races.

There were 274 households, out of which 28.8% had children under the age of 18 living with them, 52.9% were married couples living together, 9.5% had a female householder with no husband present, and 34.7% were non-families. 33.2% of all households were made up of individuals, and 20.1% had someone living alone who was 65 years of age or older. The average household size was 2.36 and the average family size was 2.99.

In the city, the population was spread out, with 26.9% under the age of 18, 5.7% from 18 to 24, 22.4% from 25 to 44, 26.2% from 45 to 64, and 18.7% who were 65 years of age or older. The median age was 40 years. For every 100 females, there were 86.7 males. For every 100 females age 18 and over, there were 82.9 males.

The median income for a household in the city was $24,000, and the median income for a family was $27,159. Males had a median income of $25,000 versus $16,375 for females. The per capita income for the city was $12,854. About 11.4% of families and 13.7% of the population were below the poverty line, including 16.0% of those under age 18 and 28.1% of those age 65 or over.

See also
 List of cities in South Dakota

References

External links

Cities in South Dakota
Cities in Butte County, South Dakota